Interpenetrating Dimensional Express is the third full-length studio album by Desmadrados Soldados de Ventura, released on 6 January 2014 by Golden Lab Records.

Track listing

Personnel
Adapted from the Interpenetrating Dimensional Express liner notes.

Desmadrados Soldados de Ventura
 Kate Armitage – vocals
 David Birchall – electric guitar
 Andrew Cheetham – drums
 Zak Hane – bass guitar
 Dylan Hughes – bass guitar
 Anthony Joinson – bass guitar
 Nick Mitchell – electric guitar
 Tom Settle – electric guitar
 Edwin Stevens – electric guitar

Production and additional personnel
 David Bailey – cover art, illustrations
 Patrick Crane – recording

Release history

References

External links 
 Interpenetrating Dimensional Express at Bandcamp

2014 albums
Desmadrados Soldados de Ventura albums